Shinnecock Hills can refer to:

Shinnecock Hills, New York, a hamlet in the Town of Southampton.
Shinnecock Hills Golf Club, a golf club in the hamlet.
Shinnecock Hills (LIRR station), former Long Island Railroad station; closed 1932.